Warren County is the name of fourteen counties in the USA. They are named after General Joseph Warren, who was killed in the Battle of Bunker Hill in the American Revolutionary War:

 Warren County, Georgia
 Warren County, Illinois
 Warren County, Indiana
 Warren County, Iowa
 Warren County, Kentucky
 Warren County, Mississippi
 Warren County, Missouri
 Warren County, New Jersey
 Warren County, New York
 Warren County, North Carolina
 Warren County, Ohio - The most populated county with the name.
 Warren County, Pennsylvania
 Warren County, Tennessee
 Warren County, Virginia